Sule Lamido University is a state-owned public university located in Kafin Hausa, Jigawa State, Nigeria. It was established 13 May 2013, licensed by National Universities Commission in July 2013 as a Jigawa State University and full academic activities commenced in September 2014. In December 2014 a bill by the Jigawa State House of Assembly effectively renamed the University.

References

External links

Universities and colleges in Nigeria
Public universities in Nigeria
2013 establishments in Nigeria
Educational institutions established in 2013